The following is a list of villages in Ukraine's Chernihiv Oblast, categorised by raion.

Chernihiv Raion 

 Baklanova Muraviika
 Viktorivka
 Yahidne

Koriukivka Raion 

 Dachne
 Kyriivka

Nizhyn Raion 

 Kobyzhcha
 Mochalyshche
 Nova Basan
 Novyi Bykiv
 Ombysh
 Perekhodivka
 Pisky
 Plysky
 Staryi Bykiv

Novhorod-Siverskyi Raion 

 Hremiach
 Kostobobriv
 Mars
 Radychiv
 Shabalyniv
 Vilkhivka
 Vyshenky

Pryluky Raion 

 Horodnia
 Olshana

Villages in Chernihiv Oblast
Chernihiv